So Loud a Silence is a 1996 young adult novel by Lyll Becerra de Jenkins. It is about a teenager, Juan Guillermo, who leaves Bogotá to live with his grandmother on a farm in the Colombian countryside.

Reception
Kirkus Reviews wrote "A moiled, disappointingly passionless view of a people burdened by grief and fear after years of unchecked violence." while Publishers Weekly described it as "An intimate coming-of-age story, against a backdrop of terrorism and loss."

So Loud a Silence has also been reviewed by ALAN Review, Booklist,
School Library Journal.
The Horn Book Magazine Book Report, and Multicultural Review.

It is a 1996 CCBC Choices book,  and a 1996 Américas Award for Children & Young Adult Literature honor book.

See also
The Honorable Prison

References

External links

Library holdings of So Loud a Silence

1996 American novels
Historical novels
Young adult novels
Bildungsromans
Dutton Penguin books
Novels set in Colombia